Islam Murtazaev (Russian: Ислам Муртазаев; born April 13, 1991) is a Russian kickboxer and mixed martial artist currently competing for ONE Championship. As of March 2023, he is ranked as the fourth best middleweight in the world by Beyond Kick.

Biography and career

Early career
Murtazaev grew up in Dagestan where he trained in wrestling before transitioning to Muay Thai at the age of 10. He competed as an amateur until 2016 when he quit his job as an oil and gas extraction engineer and moved to Thailand.

On November 18, 2017, Murtazaev took part in the EM Legend -75 kg World Tournament finals. In the semi finals he defeated Jordan Tai by decision to reach the final. He faced Rungrawee Sitsongpeenong, after 3 rounds the judges declared the fight a draw, an extra round was fought which Murtazaev won to capture the title.

On April 8, 2016, Murtazaev took part in the 2016 Kunlun Fight -75 kg World Tournament. He faced Alim Nabiev in the final 16 round and was eliminated after losing the fight by unanimous decision.

On November 30, 2018, Murtazaev faced Omar Moreno in a KOK World Series event in Spain. He won the fight with by tornado kick knockout in the first round.

Murtazaev faced Chanajon P.K. Saenchai Muaythaigym at THAI FIGHT Chiang Mai on December 23, 2017. He lost the fight by decision.

Murtazaev faced Omar Moreno in his King of Kings debut at KOK World Series on November 30, 2018. He won the fight by a first-round knockout.

Murtazaev was booked to face Sher Mamazulunov at Wu Lin Feng 2019: WLF China vs Russia on September 20, 2019, in an WLF-Orion cross-promotional event. Murtazaev won the fight by unanimous decision. The bout was later awarded "Fight of the Year" honors at the 2019 "The Orion Awards".

ONE Championship
Murtazaev challenged Regian Eersel for the ONE Lightweight World Championship at ONE: Winter Warriors on December 3, 2021. He lost the bout via split decision.

Murtazaev was expected to face the former Glory Welterweight Champion Nieky Holzken at ONE: X on March 26, 2022. The bout was later cancelled, as all Russian fighters were removed from ONE events taking place in Singapore.

Murtazaev was expected to face Sinsamut Klinmee at ONE 159 on July 22, 2022. Murtazaev later withdrew because of a "family emergency" and was replaced by Liam Nolan.

Murtazaev was expected to face the former Glory welterweight champion Nieky Holzken at ONE 162 on October 21, 2022. Holzken withdrew with an injury on October 17 and was replaced by Constantin Rusu. Murtazaev lost the fight by unanimous decision.

Murtazaev faced Ahmet Kılıç at REN TV Fight Club on November 18, 2022. He won the fight by a first-round knockout.

Murtazaev challenged Sergey Ponomarev for the Russian National -86 kg title at REN TV Fight Club on February 17, 2023. He won the fight by unanimous decision.

Titles and accomplishments

Professional
EM Legend
 2017 EM Legend World -75 kg Champion
Russian Kickboxing Federation
 2023 Russian K-1 -86 kg Championship

Amateur
International Federation of Muaythai Associations
 2015 IFMA World Championship -75 kg 
World Muaythai Federation
 2016 WMF World Championship Pro-Am -75 kg Champion

Awards
 2019 Orion Awards Fight of the Year (vs. Sher Mamazulunov)

Mixed martial arts record

|-
|Win
|align=center|1-0
| Ali Rezaelian
|TKO (Punches)
|MFE 46: Lakhlifi vs Aboyan
|
|align=center|2
|align=center|
|Yerevan, Armenia
|

Muay Thai & Kickboxing record 

|-  style="background:#cfc;"
| 2023-02-17 || Win ||align=left| Sergey Ponomarev || REN TV Fight Club || Minsk, Belarus || Decision (Unanimous) || 5 || 3:00
|-
! style=background:white colspan=9 |
|-  style="background:#cfc;"
| 2022-11-18 || Win ||align=left| Ahmet Kılıç || REN TV Fight Club || Moscow, Russia || KO (Jumping knee) || 1 ||  2:37
|-  style="background:#fbb;"
| 2022-10-21 || Loss ||align=left| Constantin Rusu  || ONE 162 || Kuala Lumpur, Malaysia || Decision (Unanimous) || 3 || 3:00  
|- style="background:#fbb;"
| 2021-12-03|| Loss ||align=left| Regian Eersel || ONE: Winter Warriors || Kallang, Singapore || Decision (Split) || 5 || 3:00
|-
! style=background:white colspan=9 |

|- align="center"  bgcolor="#cfc"
| 2019-09-20|| Win ||align=left| Sher Mamazulunov|| Wu Lin Feng 2019: WLF China vs Russia || Moscow, Russia || Decision (Unanimous)|| 3 || 3:00

|- align="center"  bgcolor="#fbb"
| 2019-07-21 || Loss ||align=left| Sinsamut Klinmee || Muaythai Night 5 || Moscow, Russia || Decision (Split) || 5 || 3:00

|-  style="background:#cfc;"
| 2018-11-30|| Win ||align=left| Omar Moreno || KOK World Series|| Valencia, Spain || KO (Tornado Kick)|| 1 || 1:35

|-  style="background:#cfc;"
| 2018-05-12|| Win ||align=left| Nicolas Mendes || Mix Fight 36|| Bilbao, Spain || KO (Spinning elbow)|| 3 || 1:38

|-  style="background:#fbb;"
| 2017-12-23 || Loss ||align=left| Chanajon P.K. Saenchai Muaythaigym || THAI FIGHT Chiang Mai || Chiang Mai, Thailand || Decision || 3 || 3:00

|- align="center"  bgcolor="#cfc"
| 2017-12-02|| Win ||align=left| Tang Xiaofeng || EM Legend 26 || Emei, China || Decision (Unanimous) || 3 || 3:00

|- align="center"  bgcolor="#cfc"
| 2017-11-18|| Win ||align=left| Rungrawee Sitsongpeenong  || EM Legend 25, Final || Zunyi, China || Ext.R Decision (Split) ||4 ||3:00 
|-
! style=background:white colspan=9 |

|- align="center"  bgcolor="#cfc"
| 2017-11-18|| Win ||align=left| Jordan Tai|| EM Legend 25, Semi Final || Zunyi, China || Decision|| 3 || 3:00

|- align="center"  bgcolor="#cfc"
| 2017-10-28|| Win ||align=left| Oleg Shamsheev|| Grand Prix Russia Open 150 || Moscow, Russia || Decision|| 3 || 3:00

|- align="center"  bgcolor="#cfc"
| 2017-05-28|| Win ||align=left| Evgeny Vorontsov|| Grand Prix Russia Open || Russia || Decision|| 3 || 3:00

|- align="center"  bgcolor="#cfc"
| 2016-12-23|| Win ||align=left| Ali Qaradaghi  || EM Legend 15|| Emei, China || Decision (Unanimous) ||3  ||3:00

|-  style="background:#cfc;"
| 2016-11-19|| Win ||align=left| Yurik Davtyan || THAI FIGHT AIR RACE 1 || Rayong, Thailand || Decision || 3 ||3:00

|-  style="background:#cfc;"
| 2016-10-15|| Win ||align=left| Sudsakorn Sor Klinmee || THAI FIGHT Chengdu|| Chengdu, China || Decision || 3 || 3:00

|- align="center"  bgcolor="#cfc"
| 2016-08-|| Win ||align=left| || PFC K1 super fight|| China ||  ||  ||

|- align="center"  bgcolor="#cfc"
| 2016-|| Win ||align=left| || Super Muaythai|| Thailand || KO (Spinning back fist) ||  ||

|-  bgcolor="#fbb"
| 2016-04-08 || Loss ||align=left| Alim Nabiev || Kunlun Fight 41, 75 kg Tournament Final 16 || Xining, China || Decision (Unanimous) || 3 || 3:00

|- align="center"  bgcolor="#cfc"
| 2016-03-13|| Win ||align=left| Praipayak Sor.Sueaphet|| Super Muay Thai|| Thailand || KO (Spinning back fist) || 3 ||

|- align="center"  bgcolor="#cfc"
| 2016-02-14 || Win ||align=left| Achim Schoepf || Super Muay Thai|| Thailand || Decision || 3 ||3:00

|-  bgcolor="#fbb"
| 2016-01-17 || Loss||align=left| Hamza Ngoto || MAX Muay Thai||  Pattaya, Thailand || Decision  ||3  || 3:00

|-  bgcolor="#fbb"
| 2013-08-31|| Loss ||align=left|  Anatoly Moiseev || Oracul Fight Zone 2013|| Russia || Decision (Unanimous)|| 3 || 3:00
|-
| colspan=9 | Legend:    

|- style="background:#cfc;"
| 2016-03-21|| Win||align=left| Marc Sauterg || 2016 WMF World Championship, Final || Bangkok, Thailand || Decision || 3 || 3:00
|-
! style=background:white colspan=9 |

|- style="background:#cfc;"
| 2016-03-20|| Win||align=left| Bernardo Carvalho || 2016 WMF World Championship, Semi Final || Bangkok, Thailand || KO ||  ||

|- style="background:#fbb;"
| 2015-08-23|| Loss||align=left| Hamza Ngoto || 2015 IFMA World Championship, Final || Bangkok, Thailand || Decision || 3 || 3:00
|-
! style=background:white colspan=9 |
|- style="background:#cfc;"
| 2015-08-|| Win||align=left| Burim Rama || 2015 IFMA World Championship, Semi Final || Bangkok, Thailand || Decision || 3 || 3:00

|- style="background:#cfc;"
| 2015-08-|| Win||align=left| Derek Jolivette || 2015 IFMA World Championship, Quarter Final || Bangkok, Thailand || TKO || 1 ||

|- style="background:#cfc;"
| 2015-08-|| Win||align=left| Mausuzbek || 2015 IFMA World Championship, Round of 16 || Bangkok, Thailand || Decision || 3 ||3:00 
|-
|- style="background:#fbb;"
| 2015-03-16 || Loss ||align=left| Nikolai Vasilenko|| 2015 Russian Cup || Russia || Decision || 3 ||3:00 
|-
| colspan=9 | Legend:

See also
 List of male kickboxers

References

External links 
Official ONE Championship profile

1991 births
Living people
Russian male kickboxers
Lightweight kickboxers
Welterweight kickboxers
Russian male mixed martial artists
Mixed martial artists utilizing Muay Thai
Russian Muay Thai practitioners
ONE Championship kickboxers
Sportspeople from Dagestan
20th-century Russian people
21st-century Russian people